Sethona is a 1774 tragedy by the British writer Alexander Dow. It is set in Ancient Egypt at a time when Menes is heir to the crown.

The original Drury Lane cast included Spranger Barry as Serapis, Samuel Reddish as Menes, Francis Aickin as Amasis, James Aickin as Orus, John Hayman Packer as Otanes and Ann Street Barry as Sethona.

References

Bibliography
 Nicoll, Allardyce. A History of English Drama 1660–1900: Volume III. Cambridge University Press, 2009.
 Hogan, C.B (ed.) The London Stage, 1660–1800: Volume V. Southern Illinois University Press, 1968.

1774 plays
Scottish plays
Tragedy plays
West End plays